Discochora is a genus of fungi in the family Botryosphaeriaceae. There are 9 species.

Species
Discochora aphyllanthis
Discochora asparagi
Discochora dianellicola
Discochora dracaenae
Discochora pini
Discochora smilacinina
Discochora smilacis
Discochora tofieldiae
Discochora yuccae

External links
Index Fungorum

Botryosphaeriaceae
Taxa named by Franz Xaver Rudolf von Höhnel
Taxa described in 1918